Keke Palmer is the self-titled second mixtape from Keke Palmer showcasing some of her new musical direction for her upcoming album. The maturity of the songs on the mixtape shows how Keke has grown. The mixtape features tracks that deal with love and loss. It was released October 1, 2012.

Background 
In 2012, Palmer spoke on the direction of the album saying "It's definitely a progression. What you would think I'd sound like at my age is what it is. It's a record I can say is truly my own. I was there from the beginning to the end. I was in full control of it, and it represents who I am." In July 2012, Palmer released the single "You Got Me" featuring Kevin McCall. The video for the single was released on July 11, 2012. Palmer has also announced a new single named "Dance Alone". Palmer released a self-titled mixtape Keke Palmer on October 1, 2012. It includes her new singles "You Got Me" and "Dance Alone" which have already been released. Since the release, her mixtape has over 35,000 downloads.

Singles 
On July 2, 2012, Palmer released the single "You Got Me" featuring Kevin McCall. The video for the single was released on July 11, 2012. "Dance Alone was released on August 21, 2012 and the music video was released on August 27, 2012. The song peaked at number 95 on the Urban Top 100 chart in the Netherlands. On June 3, 2013, Keke Palmer released a lyric video for her bonus track from her mixtape "Takes Me Away", but the song isn't released as single.

Track listing

References 

Keke Palmer albums
2012 mixtape albums